Mi-Mort is a split EP by the bands Current 93 and Nurse with Wound. It contains one track by Current 93 and four tracks by Nurse with Wound. It was released as a cassette in 1983, and was re-issued in 1984, 1985 and 1986.

Track listing
Side A
"Maldoror est Mort" - Current 93 – 17:31

Side B
"Ooh Baby (Coo Coo)" - Nurse with Wound –  6:12 
"Fashioned to a Device Behind a Tree" - Nurse with Wound – 7:22
"I Was No Longer His Dominant" - Nurse with Wound – 8:39
"A Snake in Your Abdomen" - Nurse with Wound – 6:20

References
Brainwashed.com

Current 93 albums
Split EPs
1983 EPs